South Acton may refer to:

Places
 South Acton, London, England
 South Acton, Massachusetts, an area of Acton, Massachusetts, United States

Transportation

South Acton station (MBTA), in Acton, Massachusetts, United States
South Acton railway station (England), in South Acton, London, England

See also
Acton (disambiguation)
Acton station (disambiguation)